North to the Klondike is a 1942 American action movie directed by Erle C. Kenton and starring Broderick Crawford, Evelyn Ankers and Andy Devine.  The supporting cast features Lon Chaney, Jr. in his last film before The Wolf Man, which also stars Ankers, but North to the Klondike was released the year after The Wolf Man.

Plot

Cast
 Broderick Crawford as John Thorn
 Evelyn Ankers as Mary Sloan
 Andy Devine as Klondike
 Lon Chaney Jr. as Nate Carson
 Lloyd Corrigan as Doctor Curtis
 Willie Fung as Waterlily
 Keye Luke as K. Wellington Wong
 Stanley Andrews as Jim (Tom) Allen
 Dorothy Granger as Mayme Cassidy
 Monte Blue as Burke
 Riley Hill (credited as Roy Harris) as Ben Sloan
 Paul Dubov as Piety Smith
 Fred Cordova as Indian Joe
 Jeff Corey as Lafe Jordon

References

External links
 

1942 films
Films based on works by Jack London
Films directed by Erle C. Kenton
1940s action films
American action films
Northern (genre) films
American black-and-white films
1940s American films